Sergio Díaz Castilla (born 2 July 1991) is a Spanish footballer who plays as a left back for Antequera CF.

Club career
Born in Málaga, Andalusia, Díaz spent his first year as a senior with local Atlético Malagueño, in Tercera División. In July 2011 he was loaned to Hércules CF, with the Segunda División club having an option to buy at the end of the season.

Díaz made his official debut for Hércules on 7 September 2011, in a 3–2 home win against CD Alcoyano in the second round in the Copa del Rey (a 3–0 loss was awarded later), and he played his first league match on the 16th, coming on as an 80th-minute substitute for Adrián Sardinero in the 2–1 home victory over FC Barcelona B.

References

External links

1991 births
Living people
Spanish footballers
Footballers from Málaga
Association football defenders
Segunda División players
Segunda División B players
Tercera División players
Segunda Federación players
Atlético Malagueño players
Málaga CF players
Hércules CF players
SD Huesca footballers
RCD Mallorca B players
Real Oviedo players
Córdoba CF B players
UD Melilla footballers
Antequera CF footballers